Borisov Arena (Barysaw-Arena) is a football-specific stadium in Barysaw, Belarus and is the home stadium of FC BATE Borisov and the Belarus national football team. The stadium's official capacity is 13,126.

History
The first official game ever played at the Borisov Arena was the 2013–14 Belarusian Cup Final on 3 May 2014. It was contested between FC Neman Grodno and FC Shakhtyor Soligorsk and won 1-0 by the team from Salihorsk. Ukrainian midfielder Artem Starhorodskyi scored the first ever goal on the stadium in front of an almost full capacity of over 11,000.

National team matches
The Belarus national football team played its first game at the Borisov Arena on 4 September 2014 when they defeated Tajikistan 6–1 in a friendly. The first official national team game was played on 9 October 2014, when Belarus lost 0–2 to Ukraine in a UEFA Euro 2016 qualifier played in front of 10,512 spectators.

List of games

Gallery

References

External links

Official website of the football club 
Official website of the football club 

FC BATE Borisov
Football venues in Belarus
Belarus national football team
Multi-purpose stadiums in Belarus
Sports venues completed in 2014
Barysaw
2014 establishments in Belarus